Poison Kiss is the only studio album by the American rock band The Last Goodnight (formerly Renata), and the only album released under that moniker. It released in August 2007. After their 2008 tour, the band was dropped by Virgin, and disbanded shortly after.

Singles
 June 12, 2007 – "Pictures of You"
 March 31, 2008 – "Stay Beautiful"
 October 13, 2008 – "In Your Arms" (Australian release only)

Track listing

 "Poison Kiss" – 3:47 
 "Back Where We Belong" – 3:50 
 "Pictures of You" – 3:10 
 "Stay Beautiful" – 3:14 
 "This Is the Sound" – 3:18 
 "One Trust" – 3:55 
 "Return to Me" – 3:10 
 "Good Love" – 3:40 
 "If I Talk to God" – 3:36 
 "Push Me Away" – 3:00 
 "In Your Arms" – 3:31 
 "Incomplete" – 3:41
 "When It All Comes Down" (bonus track) – 2:58

Charts

Release history

References

2007 debut albums
The Last Goodnight albums
Virgin Records albums